The 1948 season was Wisła Krakóws 40th year as a club.

Friendlies

Mixed teams

Ekstraklasa

League matches

Final

Squad, appearances and goals

|-
|}

Goalscorers

External links
1948 Wisła Kraków season at historiawisly.pl

Wisła Kraków seasons
Association football clubs 1948 season
Wisla